Jeanette Marie Nuñez (née Sanchez; born June 6, 1972) is an American businesswoman and politician serving as the 20th lieutenant governor of Florida since 2019. A member of the Republican Party, she represented Miami-Dade County in the Florida House of Representatives from 2010 to 2018, also serving as speaker pro tempore for her final two years in the office. Nuñez is the first Latina to serve as Florida lieutenant governor.

Early life and education
Nuñez was born in Miami to a Cuban father Victor C. Sanchez and Teresita Sanchez and is one of three daughters. In 1994, she earned a Bachelor of Arts degree in political science and international relations from Florida International University (FIU). In 1998, Nuñez completed her Master of Public Administration at FIU.

Career 
Her first job after completing her undergraduate studies was as an aide to State Senator Alex Diaz de la Portilla. Nuñez later entered the health care industry, working as the vice-president of government affairs at Jackson Health System. Nuñez also worked for Florida International University as an adjunct professor and advisor. She also served as the vice-president of external affairs at Kendall Regional Medical Center and Aventura Hospital & Medical Center, until becoming the lieutenant governor of Florida.

Florida House of Representatives 
When incumbent state representative David Rivera was unable to seek re-election in 2010 due to term limits, Nuñez ran to succeed him in the 112th District, which included parts of Broward, Collier, and Miami-Dade counties, stretching from Doral to Naples. In the Republican primary, she faced Juan D'Arce and James Patrick Guerrero, and campaigned on working to pass legislation to "improve the economy" and to "reform the Medicaid program in order to contain the ever-growing costs that affect taxpayers." Ultimately, Nuñez won the primary over her opponents, receiving 66% of the vote to D'Arce's 19% and Guerrero's 15%. Advancing to the general election, she faced Sandra Ruiz, the Democratic nominee and a Doral City councilwoman, and Robert Van Name, an independent candidate. Nuñez campaigned on job creation, noting, "For me, the most important issue for District 112 and in fact for the entire state of Florida is creating jobs, improving the economy and lowering the tax burden for businesses and property owners." The Naples Daily News criticized the nature of the district, noting, "If there is a textbook reason for redistricting reform, this race...would be it," and opined that "there is little sense of Collier connection from either Miami-based candidate." Despite this, they endorsed Nuñez over Ruiz because Nuñez met with the editorial board and Ruiz did not, which they noted was "a dreadful measuring stick for picking such a high-ranking public servant." Ultimately, Nuñez won out over her opponents by a comfortable margin, scoring 56% of the vote to Ruiz's 39% and Van Name's 5%.

When the state's legislative districts were redrawn in 2012, Nuñez was drawn into the 119th District, where she opted to seek re-election. She was challenged in the Republican primary by Libby Perez, but easily won renomination with 73% of the vote. Nuñez only faced write-in opposition in the general election and easily won re-election.

During the 2014 legislative session, Nuñez worked with state senator Jack Latvala to sponsor legislation that "would allow the children of undocumented immigrants to pay the same in-state tuition rates for college as other Floridians," which ended up passing the legislature.

As reported by The Hill in 2018, Jeanette Nuñez introduced legislation in Florida "to standardize daylight saving time for the entire calendar year". To make the "Sunshine Protection Act" nationwide, Senator Marco Rubio  sponsored a bill in the Senate since the state bill cannot take effect until the federal government makes the change. This is because the "provision would shift the state into a different time zone permanently", something which requires a federal regulatory action or an act of Congress.

Lieutenant governor of Florida

Selection 
On September 5, 2018, then-congressman Ron DeSantis selected Nuñez to be his running mate in the 2018 Florida gubernatorial election, facing off against Andrew Gillum and running mate Chris King. DeSantis and Nuñez would go on to win the election by a margin of less than half of a percentage point. Nuñez is the first Latina woman to serve as lieutenant governor of Florida.

In 2022 Ron DeSantis was reelected, with 59.4% of the vote representing a more than 1.6 million vote margin over Charlie Crist. It was the largest margin of any Republican ever elected governor of Florida and included wins in Miami-Dade for a Republican gubernatorial candidate the first time since 2002, as well as other counties that had similarly voted for Democrats even longer.

Tenure 
Nuñez was sworn in as lieutenant governor on January 8, 2019, succeeding Carlos Lopez-Cantera. During her time in office, she has hosted various roundtables and events in support of exiles from Venezuela.

Personal life
Jeanette Nuñez married Adrian Nuñez in 1997. They have three children.

See also 
 List of minority governors and lieutenant governors in the United States

References

External links
Florida House of Representatives - Jeanette Núñez

|-

|-

|-

|-

 

1972 births
21st-century American politicians
21st-century American women politicians
American politicians of Cuban descent
Hispanic and Latino American state legislators in Florida
Florida International University alumni
Hispanic and Latino American women in politics
Lieutenant Governors of Florida
Living people
Republican Party members of the Florida House of Representatives
Politicians from Miami
Women state legislators in Florida
Latino conservatism in the United States